The  Industrial Designers Society of America (IDSA) is a membership-based not-for-profit organization that promotes the practice and education of industrial design.

The organization was formally established in 1965 by the collaborative merger of the Industrial Designers Institute (IDI), the American Society of Industrial Designers (ASID), and the Industrial Designers Education Association (IDEA). However, its origins can be traced back to the 1920s, prior to the founding in 1938 of the American Design Institute (ADI), which was the predecessor of IDI.<ref>Dubofsky, Melvyn (ed.) (2013). [https://books.google.com/books?id=D-NMAgAAQBAJ&pg=PA369 The Oxford Encyclopedia of American Business, Labor, and Economic History], p. 369. Oxford University Press. </ref> Its first chairman was John Vassos and its first president was Henry Dreyfuss.

The society publishes a quarterly journal, Innovation, in which Klaus Krippendorff coined the term "product semantics" in his 1984 article "Exploring the Symbolic Qualities of Form", as well as books such as Design Secrets: Products: 50 Real-Life Projects Uncovered''.

In 1980, the society established the International Design Excellence Awards (IDEA).

See also
 Designer
 Product development

References

External links
Official website
Idsa.org: History of IDSA 

Business organizations based in the United States
Engineering societies based in the United States
Organizations established in 1965
1965 establishments in the United States